France is divided into 577 constituencies (circonscriptions) for the election of deputies to the lower legislative House, the National Assembly (539 in Metropolitan France, 27 in the overseas departments and territories, and 11 for French residents overseas). Deputies are elected in a two round system to a term fixed to a maximum of five years.

In 2010, a new set of constituency boundaries was adopted, with the dual purpose of ensuring a more equal number of voters per constituency, and of providing seats in the National Assembly to representatives of French citizens resident outside France. 33 constituencies were abolished, and 33 new ones created. Of the latter, 17 are in metropolitan France, five are in overseas France, while the rest of the world was divided into 11 constituencies for French residents overseas. These new constituencies were contested for the first time in the National Assembly elections of June 2012.

Metropolitan France: 539 constituencies

Overseas: 27 constituencies

Guadeloupe (971) – 4 seats

Martinique (972) – 4 seats

Guiana (973) – 2 seats

Réunion (974) – 7 seats

Saint Pierre and Miquelon (975) – 1 seat

Mayotte (976) – 2 seats

Saint Barthélemy and Saint Martin (977) – 1 seat

Wallis and Futuna (986) – 1 seat

French Polynesia (987) – 3 seats

New Caledonia (988) – 2 seats

French Citizens Overseas : 11 seats

See also
Lists of electoral districts by nation

References

 
Constituencies of the National Assembly of France
France